Harold Hale (27 March 1867 – 2 August 1947) was an Australian cricketer.

Hale was born in Perth in the Colony of Western Australia, the son of Matthew Hale, then Bishop of Perth and later Bishop of Brisbane. He went to school at The Hutchins School in Hobart. He toured New Zealand with the Tasmanian cricket team when he was 16, opening the bowling with Tom Kendall in the four first-class matches on the tour, taking 21 wickets at a bowling average of 9.47 runs per wicket.

His father retired to England in 1885, and Hale attended Trinity College, Cambridge between 1886 and 1889. He played cricket for the University in 1887, 1889 and 1890, receiving his cricket blue. He also played for Gloucestershire. He graduated with a degree in Theology and tutored in England for about 10 years before returning to Tasmania. He again played for the state team, finishing his first-class career in 1911. He conducted a small private school in New Norfolk and later farmed in the area.

He married Georgina Officer in Melbourne in December 1901, and they had three sons and two daughters. He died in 1947 in a Melbourne hospital aged 80; his wife predeceased him.

References

1867 births
1947 deaths
Australian cricketers
Gloucestershire cricketers
Cricketers from Perth, Western Australia
Tasmania cricketers
Cambridge University cricketers
Gentlemen of England cricketers
Alumni of Trinity College, Cambridge